The ICW / IWCCW Heavyweight Championship was the top singles championship of International World Class Championship Wrestling between 1984 and 1995 where IWCCW closed down operations. Initially ICW’s main title was the WWC Universal Heavyweight Championship, through a talent exchange program and a close working relationship between ICW and WWC the Universal Title was promoted in the New England area as the main ICW title without ever mentioning the WWC name, nor was it presented as a title owned by ICW. When the arrangement came to an end in 1985 a specific “ICW Heavyweight Championship” was created with the lineage of the WWC Universal title during the time of the working relationship. In 1993 the then champion Tony Atlas along with a number of IWCCW wrestlers left the company leaving the title vacant and only used sporadically between 1993 and 1995 where the promotion closed. Because the championship is a professional wrestling championship, it is not won or lost competitively but instead by the decision of the bookers of a wrestling promotion. The championship is awarded after the chosen team "wins" a match to maintain the illusion that professional wrestling is a competitive sport.

Title history

Footnotes

References

ICW Heavyweight Championship
International World Class Championship Wrestling championships